Romeo & Juliet is a 2013 romantic drama film adaptation of William Shakespeare's romantic tragedy of the same name written by Julian Fellowes and directed by Carlo Carlei. The film stars Douglas Booth, Hailee Steinfeld, Damian Lewis, Kodi Smit-McPhee, Ed Westwick, Stellan Skarsgård and Paul Giamatti. The film opened in the United Kingdom and the United States on 11 October 2013. Like Franco Zeffirelli's adaptation of Shakespeare's tragedy, this film uses the traditional setting of Renaissance Verona, but, unlike previous major film adaptations, only follows the plot and uses only some of the dialogue as written by Shakespeare. This has led to several critics denouncing the film's advertising as misleading and losing the essence of the play. The film grossed $3 million.

Plot
During the late Middle Ages in Verona, two wealthy families, the Montagues and Capulets, have been feuding for centuries. One day at the market place, the feuding families start a brawl which infuriates the Prince and he threatens that if the peace of Verona is disturbed again, he shall take their lives. Meanwhile, Romeo, a young Montague, reveals that he is in love with Lord Capulet's niece, Rosaline. Romeo's cousin, Benvolio persuades him to forget Rosaline but Romeo rebuffs him.

Later that night, there is a party held by Lord Capulet. Romeo sneaks in with Benvolio and Mercutio hoping to meet Rosaline. Instead, Romeo sees Juliet who is Lord Capulet's daughter and falls in love with her. Juliet feels the same and they share a dance. They go together to a quiet place and share a passionate kiss. Juliet's Nurse interrupts and when Romeo talks to the nurse, he discovers that Juliet is a Capulet.

After the party ends, Romeo sneaks into Juliet's garden secretly where he witnesses Juliet expressing her love for him. He climbs the balcony and they quickly decide to get married the next day. Romeo seeks help from Friar Laurence to wed them and the Friar agrees thinking that their love may end the violent war between Capulets and Montagues. They perform the ceremony and afterwards Juliet returns home. Romeo catches up with Mercutio and Benvolio but they meet Tybalt and his men on the way. This starts another violent brawl during which Tybalt stabs Mercutio. Romeo is enraged and runs after Tybalt seeking revenge. They fight and Romeo slays Tybalt. As the result of this loss, the Prince banishes Romeo from Verona.

Meanwhile, both families are filled with grief over their losses, especially Juliet. The Friar sends Romeo to Juliet one last night with her. Romeo goes to Juliet and they consummate their marriage. Romeo leaves in haste the next morning. But Juliet is shocked when her father brings news of planning to wed Juliet with Count Paris. Juliet is resistant but her father threatens to disown her if she does not wed Paris. Juliet goes to Friar Laurence for help, threatening to kill herself if the Friar does not have a solution. The Friar in return, gives her a potion that will put her in a deathlike sleep temporarily while he will inform Romeo about this and they shall run away together to Mantua. Juliet drinks the potion that night. Her parents are devastated when they find her next morning, and instead of her marriage, her funeral is planned. During the funeral, Benvolio sees Juliet and thinks she is dead and immediately runs off to tell Romeo.

Friar's letter however, does not reach Romeo and Benvolio tells Romeo that Juliet is dead. Romeo is shocked and devastated and plans to take his life. He buys poison and goes to Juliet. Paris tries to stop him, but is killed in a sword fight. Romeo kisses Juliet one last time, then he drinks the poison unaware that Juliet has awakened. Juliet is overjoyed to see him and they kiss but Romeo suddenly collapses. When Juliet finds out that Romeo took poison, he dies in her arms. The Friar arrives to find a heartbroken Juliet weeping over Romeo's dead body. He hears some guards coming and leaves to hold them off, trying to persuade Juliet to come with him, without success. When Juliet hears the approaching watchmen, she finds and stabs herself with Romeo's dagger. The Friar returns to find them both dead.

Their funeral is held together and the Capulets and Montagues finally reconcile, ending their feud. During the procession, Benvolio steps forward and joins their hands.

Cast

 Hailee Steinfeld as Juliet Capulet
 Douglas Booth as Romeo Montague
 Damian Lewis as Lord Capulet
 Natascha McElhone as Lady Capulet
 Ed Westwick as Tybalt
 Nathalie Rapti Gomez as Rosaline Capulet
 Lesley Manville as Nurse
 Tom Wisdom as Count Paris
 Tomas Arana as Lord Montague
 Laura Morante as Lady Montague
 Kodi Smit-McPhee as Benvolio Montague
 Christian Cooke as Mercutio
 Anton Alexander as Abraham
 Paul Giamatti as Friar Lawrence
 Stellan Skarsgård as Prince Escalus of Verona
 Leon Vitali as Apothecary
 Simona Caparrini as female guest

Production

Production and casting

Ed Westwick was the first actor to read the script.  In April 2011, Hailee Steinfeld was said to be in talks for the lead role as Juliet in this adaptation. Owing to Steinfeld's young age, there was some concern she would be asked to appear nude in the film. Director Carlo Carlei explained, "there was a lovemaking scene that included nudity for the married Romeo and Juliet. This script was written with a 20-year-old actress in mind. As soon as Hailee Steinfeld was cast, all nudity and lovemaking have been excised from the script. It will be romantic and age-appropriate for a 14-year-old." The role of Romeo was found in June 2011 when Douglas Booth was cast, beating 300 other actors who were interested in the part. Paul Wesley had been offered the role of Count Paris, but it was announced in February 2012 that Tom Wisdom would play him.

Principal photography started on 3 February 2012 in Italy. The film was shot at the grotto Sacro Speco in Subiaco; Mantua; Caprarola, Lazio; Cinecittà, Rome; and in Verona. The first pictures of the set were posted on Italian newspaper Gazzetta di Mantova on 14 February 2012. Steinfeld finished filming her scenes on 7 March 2012.

Release

Theatrical release and premiere
Relativity Media was paid for by the producers to release the movie in North America on 11 October 2013, while the film was released through D Films in Canada on the same date. The premiere was held in Hollywood on 24 September 2013 at the ArcLight Hollywood. It was released in Australia on 13 February 2014.

Home media
20th Century Fox Home Entertainment released the film on DVD and Blu-ray on February 4, 2019.

Reception

Critical reception

The film holds a 24% approval rating and an average score of 4.54/10 on aggregate review site Rotten Tomatoes based on 89 reviews; the consensus reads: "Shakespeare's classic romance gets a so-so adaptation that's short on passion and energy." The film has a 41 out of 100 rating on Metacritic based on 30 reviews, indicating "mixed reviews".

Accolades
Romeo & Juliet was nominated at the Golden Trailer Awards for Best Romantic Poster, and won International Film Music Critics Association Award for Film Score of the Year.

Soundtrack
 L'Amor Dona Ch'Io Te Porto Anonymous, late 15th Century - Performed by Ensemble La Rossignol
 Tourdion (Pierre Attaignant) - Performed by Ensemble La Rossignol
 Skin - Written and Performed by Zola Jesus

James Horner's initial soundtrack was rejected by producers for sounding too similar to his previous works.

References

External links
 
 
 
 

2013 films
2013 romantic drama films
American romantic drama films
British romantic drama films
English-language Italian films
Italian romantic drama films
Films based on Romeo and Juliet
Films set in Italy
Films shot in Italy
Relativity Media films
Films directed by Carlo Carlei
Films with screenplays by Julian Fellowes
2010s English-language films
Casting controversies in film
Obscenity controversies in film
2010s American films
2010s British films